The 2012 European F3 Open Championship was the fourth European F3 Open Championship season. The series introduced the new Dallara F312 cars for Class A, with the F308 model being implemented for the Copa Class.

Teams and drivers
 All cars are powered by Toyota engines. Main class powered by Dallara F312, while Copa Class by Dallara F308 chassis.